Croatia sent seven competitors to the 2018 Winter Paralympics in Pyeongchang, South Korea, in three disciplines - alpine skiing, cross-country skiing and snowboarding. Snowboarder Bruno Bošnjak won a bronze medal, the first ever medal for Croatia at any Winter Paralympic Games.

Medalists

| width="78%" align="left" valign="top" |

| width="22%" align="left" valign="top" |

Alpine skiing 

Women

Men

Cross-country skiing 

Men

Snowboarding 

Men

See also
Croatia at the 2018 Winter Olympics
Croatia at the Paralympics

References

External links 
 XII. Zimske Paraolimpijske igre 2018: 7 hrvatskih sportaša u Pyeong Changu (in Croatian)
 Dino Sokolović nastupa prvog, a Eva Goluža posljednjeg dana natjecanja (in Croatian)

2018
Nations at the 2018 Winter Paralympics
2018 in Croatian sport